The Scottish Leaving Certificate was established in 1888 by Henry Craik, permanent secretary of the Scottish Education Department. It was replaced, in 1962, by the Scottish Certificate of Education as an educational qualification. One primary distinction between the Scottish Leaving Certificate and the Scottish Certificate of Education was that the latter had less strict regulations in terms of compulsory subjects and workload of the individual curricula.

See also
 History of education in Scotland

References

Educational qualifications in Scotland
School examinations
Secondary school qualifications
1888 establishments in Scotland
1888 in politics
1888 in education
History of education in Scotland
Secondary education in Scotland